Greeley–Weld County Airport  is a public use airport located three nautical miles (6 km) east of the central business district of Greeley, a city in Weld County, Colorado, United States. It is owned by the Greeley–Weld County Airport Authority. This airport is included in the National Plan of Integrated Airport Systems for 2011–2015, which categorized it as a general aviation facility.

History 
The airport opened in June, 1944, as Greeley Municipal Airport. In September of that year it was dedicated as Crosier Field in honor of World War II aviator Clarence F. "Red" Crosier. Joint ownership by the City of Greeley and Weld County began in 1963, with a new terminal and hangars added throughout that decade. The Greeley–Weld County Airport Authority was established in 1978 and is responsible for operation and development of the airport. A new  runway and a new terminal were opened in 2000.

Facilities and aircraft 

For the 12-month period ending December 31, 2010, the airport had 143,000 aircraft operations, an average of 391 per day: 99% general aviation and 1% military.
At that time there were 195 aircraft based at this airport: 83% single-engine, 13% multi-engine, 2% jet, and 2% helicopter.

The 233rd Space Group (233rd SG) is a unit of the Colorado Air National Guard located at Greeley Air National Guard Station, which is adjacent to the Greeley–Weld County Airport and makes use of its runways.

References

External links 
 
 Greeley - Weld County Airport (GXY) at Colorado DOT airport directory
 Aerial image as of October 1999 from USGS The National Map
 
 

Airports in Colorado
Transportation buildings and structures in Weld County, Colorado